Hebeloma incarnatulum is a species of mushroom in the family Hymenogastraceae. It occurs in Europe and around the North American Great Lakes, often in mossy areas. It is similar to H. crustuliniforme.

References 

incarnatulum
Fungi of Europe